James Michael "Mike" Sprayberry (born April 24, 1947) is a former United States Army officer and a recipient of the United States military's highest decoration, the Medal of Honor, for his actions in the Vietnam War.

Early life and military career
Born in LaGrange, Georgia, on April 24, 1947, Sprayberry grew up in Sylacauga, Alabama. He joined the Army from Montgomery in 1967, and by April 25, 1968 was serving as a first lieutenant in Company D, 5th Battalion, 7th Cavalry Regiment, 1st Cavalry Division (Airmobile). On that day, in the Republic of Vietnam, he led a patrol which rescued men who had been wounded and cut off from the rest of the company. In the course of the rescue mission, Sprayberry personally destroyed several enemy bunkers and machine gun emplacements. He was subsequently promoted to captain and awarded the Medal of Honor for his actions.

Sprayberry reached the rank of lieutenant colonel before retiring from the army in 1988.

Personal life
Sprayberry lives in Titus, Elmore County, Alabama.

Medal of Honor citation
Sprayberry's official Medal of Honor citation reads:

See also

List of Medal of Honor recipients for the Vietnam War

References

1947 births
Living people
People from LaGrange, Georgia
People from Sylacauga, Alabama
People from Elmore County, Alabama
Military personnel from Alabama
Military personnel from Georgia (U.S. state)
United States Army officers
United States Army personnel of the Vietnam War
United States Army Medal of Honor recipients
Vietnam War recipients of the Medal of Honor